Ming Tian (born 8 April 1995) is a Chinese professional footballer who currently plays as a defender for Wuhan Zall.

Club career
Ming Tian would play for the Wuhan Zall youth team before being sent to France to study with the FC Sochaux-Montbéliard football team for three months. On his return he would be promoted to the senior team and go on to establish himself as regular within the club. He would go on to be an integral member of the team that gained promotion to the top tier for the club by winning the 2018 China League One division. He would make his top tier debut on 1 March 2019 against Beijing Sinobo Guoan F.C. in a league game that ended in a 1–0 defeat. This would be followed by his first goal for the club on 1 June 2019 in a league game against Shenzhen F.C. that ended in 2–0 victory.

International career
On 10 December 2019, Ming would make his senior international debut against Japan in a 2–1 defeat in the EAFF E-1 Football Championship.

Career statistics

Club

International

Honours

Club
Wuhan Zall
 China League One: 2018

References

External links

1995 births
Living people
Chinese footballers
Association football defenders
China League One players
Chinese Super League players
Wuhan F.C. players
China international footballers